Nightwatch is a 1994 Danish horror thriller film directed and written by Danish director Ole Bornedal. The film involves Martin (Nikolaj Coster-Waldau) who gets a student job as night watchman at the Forensic Medicine Institute. When making his rounds he finds he must go to where the deceased people are kept. At the same time, a series of murders occur among women in Copenhagen as well as mysterious and unexplained things happening in the medical department.

Nightwatch was a success in Denmark and was shown at the Fantafestival in 1995. An English-language remake of the film, also directed by Bornedal, was released in 1997. The original Nightwatch was included on a list of the top 100 Danish films as chosen by Kosmorama.

Plot 
Law student Martin Bork (Nikolaj Coster Waldau) gets a student job as night watchman at the Forensic Medicine Institute, believing it will allow more time to study, with his biggest problem being his paranoia in this scary setting. When making his rounds, he finds he must go to where the deceased people are kept. At the same time, a series of murders occur among women in Copenhagen, and mysterious and unexplained things start to happen in the medical department. During all of this, Martin ends up being confused with one of the murders, becoming a prime suspect.

Production 
Director Ole Bornedal began writing the script for Nightwatch after the release of his television film Masturbator (1993). He was inspired to make the movie after a trip he made to a morgue in Copenhagen. He stated in an interview, "I went to this morgue in a city of one million people, and it was both scary and beautiful. It made me think about how, outside, there is this daily life going on, and suddenly you're standing in a cellar realizing this is where it all ends. It makes you think about life and how you're living it."

Bornedal also wrote much of the script at night, he states: "I was writing the story at night, in an office all by myself, sometimes until four in the morning. I didn't dare go out to my car because I would have to walk through all of these dark hallways." Principal photography would occur in Denmark during 1993.

Cast 
 Nikolaj Coster-Waldau as Martin Bork
 Sofie Gråbøl as Kalinka Martens
 Kim Bodnia as Jens Arnkiel
  as Lotte
 Ulf Pilgaard as Peter Wörmer
  as Joyce
  as Rolf
 Gyrd Løfquist as The Old Nightwatch
  as The Doctor

Release 
The film was released on 25 February 1994. Nightwatch was a success in Denmark where it sold 465,529 tickets. The film was shown at the 1995 Fantafestival in Rome, Italy. The film was selected to be part of the 1994 Critic's Week at the Cannes Film Festival.

A DVD of Nightwatch was released by Anchor Bay on 29 May 2001. The disc contains an audio commentary by Ole Bornedal and a theatrical trailer for the film.

Reception 

Ole Bornedal felt that Nightwatch was not "a great work of art, but it did help legitimate the idea that even European film art can make good use of generic stories." Nightwatch was included on a list of the top 100 Danish film as chosen by Kosmorama.  won the award for Best Supporting Actress for her portrayal of Joyce in the film at the 1995 Bodil Awards. Variety gave the film a fairly favorable review, referring to it as a "slickly made but fairly conventional tale".

Remake 

An English-language remake of the film, also titled Nightwatch, was released in 1997 and directed by Ole Bornedal, but with a new script by Steven Soderbergh based on Bornedal's original film.

Notes

References

External links 
 
 
 
 Nightwatch at Rotten Tomatoes

1990s psychological thriller films
1990s serial killer films
1994 films
Best Danish Film Robert Award winners
Danish thriller films
1990s Danish-language films
Films about security and surveillance
Films directed by Ole Bornedal